The Hainan western ring high-speed railway (often abbreviated ) is a high-speed railway operated by China Railway Guangzhou Group in Hainan Province. It started operation on 30 December 2015.

At its two end points, it connects with the existing Hainan eastern ring high-speed railway (opened in 2010), thus forming a high-speed railway ring spanning 653 kms long, around the entire island, as well as the world’s first and only circular high-speed railway line. The circular closed loop allows passengers to travel along the entire circumference of the island in approximately 3 hours at the shortest time, and connects all twelve coastal cities and counties, as well as having additional stops at Haikou and Sanya airports.

Unlike the Hainan eastern ring high-speed railway, which runs along the coast previously not served by railway (other than at its end points, Haikou and Sanya), the Western Ring high-speed railway roughly parallels the conventional-speed Hainan Western Ring Railway, which has connected Haikou and Sanya since 2005.

History
The Hainan western ring railway was constructed in two stages.

The first short section connects the existing Sanya railway station with the new Phoenix Airport railway station,  to the west. The section has one intermediate station, Sanya West  railway station. The construction work on this section was planned to be completed by the end of 2014.

On the rest of the railway - the much longer section from Sanya Phoenix Airport to Haikou - progress was only in its preliminary phase in 2012. Property was acquired, and demolition was conducted. According to the construction plans, 22,300 mu of land will be permanently used by the railway and associated facilities, and another 8,800 mu was temporary used during construction. Eighty-seven thousand m2 of housing was demolished. The necessary demolitions were completed by the end of 2013.

On November 2015, the first test train travelled on the 344km Western ring high-speed railway, and completed the 652 km circular railway loop around the island. The western ring high-speed railway became officially operational and open to the public on December 2015.

Stations
As of 2018, many of the stations were not in use. The list below names the settlements where the stations are located. They will be named correspondingly.

Haikou railway station
Laochengzhen railway station
Fushanzhen railway station
Lingao South railway station
Yintan railway station
Baimajing railway station
Haitou railway station
Qiziwan railway station
Dongfang railway station
Jinyuewan railway station
Jianfeng railway station
Huangliu railway station
Ledong railway station
Yazhou railway station
Phoenix Airport railway station
Sanya railway station

Rolling stock
CRH1A-A 8-car sets (since 30 December 2015)
CR300-AF 8-car sets (since 1 February 2021)

See also
Hainan eastern ring high-speed railway, the eastern half of the high-speed railway in Hainan Province
Hainan western ring railway, the conventional-speed railway

Notes

External links

High-speed railway lines in China
Railway lines opened in 2015
Standard gauge railways in China
Transport in Hainan
Airport rail links in China
25 kV AC railway electrification